Jakub Šindelář (born 20 November 1986) is a Czech handball player for Talent Plzeň and the Czech national team.

References

1986 births
Living people
Czech male handball players
Sportspeople from Plzeň